Shahdan bin Sulaiman (born 9 May 1988) is a Singaporean professional footballer who plays as a midfielder for Hougang United and the Singapore national team. Mainly a central-midfielder, he is also capable of playing as a defensive-midfielder or a centre-back. He is known for his deliveries from corner kicks and as a free-kick specialist.

Club career

JDT 
Shahdan previously played for S.League clubs Home United, Tampines Rovers & Young Lions. He moved to play for the LionsXII in the Malaysia Super League for the 2012 season. In 2012, while playing for the LionsXII, Shahdan Sulaiman's impressive form had attracted the attention of the Thai scouts from Pattaya United F.C. who likened him to be a player in the mould of Kaka due to his vision and passing ability. He was briefly considered by the Thai club to join as part of their foreign Asian player scheme, but the move did not happen.

Tampines Rovers 
He joined Tampines Rovers in the 2013 season after he was left out of the LionsXII squad as the squad was mostly made up of U-23 players in preparation of the Southeast Asian Games.

In 2013, he signed a 23 months contract with his old club Tampines Rovers. He finished the 2013 season with 4 goals and 9 assists. At the end of 2014, while playing for the national team in the AFF Championship, he picked up an injury which ruled him out for 6 months of the 2015 season.

Back to LionsXII 
Following his recovery from a long-term injury he picked up at the end of 2014, Shahdan re-joined the LionsXII in 2015. He made his long awaited comeback in a game against Sime Darby as a late substitute in May 2015. In his next match against ATM FA, he scored with his first touch of the ball and made his first start in July, against Kelantan.

Re-signing for the Stags 
In January 2016, after the disbandment of LionsXII, he went back to Tampines Rovers FC, although he has had to take a huge pay cut. Shahdan played a key role in the team, starting 10 out of 10 league games for the stags before he then missed a huge chunk of the season due to an injury that he picked up in the 90th minute of an AFC Cup tie with Selangor at the Singapore Sports Hub. He marked his return in late October, helping his team to a 3-1 win over the Young Lions and eventually secured a place in the national team for the 2016 AFF Championship.

Shahdan remained with the stags for the 2017 S.League season. He had a good season, scoring 6 goals in all competitions, with his performances attracting interest from MSL side Melaka United.

Melaka United 
Shahdan signed for Malaysia Super League side Melaka United for the 2018 MSL season on a season long loan from the Stags to fill their ASEAN foreign player slot.

Returning to Tampines Rovers
Shahdan returned to the Stags for the 2019 Singapore Premier League season and had a stellar season where he was one of three nominees for the Player of the Year award.

Lion City Sailors
Shahdan then signed for the Singapore Premier League's first privatised club, the Lion City Sailors for the 2020 Singapore Premier League season.

International career 
Shahdan got his first goal for the national team in a 2–2 draw with Azerbaijan, scoring a last gasp equaliser to help the Lions come back from behind.

As of December 2017, Shahdan has amassed 51 caps for the senior national team.

Career statistics

Club

1 Includes Singapore Cup and Malaysia FA Cup.
2 Includes Malaysia Cup and Singapore League Cup.

International goals
Scores and results list Singapore's goal tally first.

Honours

Singapore
ASEAN Football Championship: 2012

Tampines Rovers
 S. League: 2011, 2013
 Singapore Cup: 2019

Lion City Sailors

 Singapore Premier League: 2021

Others

Singapore Selection Squad
He was selected as part of the Singapore Selection squad for The Sultan of Selangor's Cup to be held on 24 August 2019.

References

External links
 
 Fas.org.sg
 Goal.com

1988 births
Living people
Singaporean footballers
Singapore international footballers
Singaporean expatriate footballers
Home United FC players
Tampines Rovers FC players
Singapore Premier League players
LionsXII players
Association football midfielders
Malaysia Super League players
Young Lions FC players
Footballers at the 2010 Asian Games
Southeast Asian Games bronze medalists for Singapore
Southeast Asian Games medalists in football
Competitors at the 2011 Southeast Asian Games
Asian Games competitors for Singapore
Lion City Sailors FC players